Johan Mattsson (born 25 April 1992) is a Swedish professional ice hockey goaltender. He is currently playing with Avtomobilist Yekaterinburg of the Kontinental Hockey League (KHL).

Playing career
Mattsson played with Södertälje SK in the Elitserien during the 2008–09 Elitserien postseason.

Mattsson was the last player selected in the 2011 NHL Entry Draft, taken with the 211th overall pick by the Chicago Blackhawks in the 7th round. Mattsson was later drafted by the Sudbury Wolves of the Ontario Hockey League with the 19th pick in the Canadian Hockey League Import Draft. After attending training camp with the Blackhawks, Mattsson returned to the Wolves to start the 2011–12 OHL season.

In 2013, un-signed from the Blackhawks he returned home to play in the Swedish HockeyAllsvenskan (the division under the SHL) with Djurgårdens IF as the new head goalkeeper, replacing Chet Pickard who went back to NHL.

After four seasons in the Allsvenskan, Mattsson returned to the top tier, agreeing to a two-year contract with Frölunda HC on April 20, 2017.

Mattsson remained with Frölunda HC for four seasons, before leaving as a free agent following the 2020–21 season. On 15 April 2021, Mattsson signed his first contract abroad, agreeing to a contract with Latvian based KHL club, Dinamo Riga.

Awards and honours

References

External links

1992 births
Living people
Avtomobilist Yekaterinburg players
IF Björklöven players
Chicago Blackhawks draft picks
Dinamo Riga players
Djurgårdens IF Hockey players
Frölunda HC players
People from Huddinge Municipality
Södertälje SK players
Sudbury Wolves players
Swedish ice hockey goaltenders
Timrå IK players
Tri-City Storm players
Sportspeople from Stockholm County